Anna Gustafsson Chen (born 18 January 1965) is a Swedish literary translator and sinologist. She is notable for translating the work of Mo Yan (the 2012 Nobel Prize in literature winner) into Swedish. Her translations are directly tied to Mo Yan becoming the first Chinese person to win the Nobel Prize for Literature. She has translated over 20 other notable works including the writing of Yu Hua and Su Tong.

Biography
Chen was born in Sweden in 1965. She entered Stockholm University in 1985, studying Chinese language and Chinese Literature under Göran Malmqvist. She earned a doctorate in Chinese language and literature from Lund University in 1997. After graduation, Chen worked in Stockholm International Library as an administrator.

Chen worked in a Swedish Museum.

Translations from Chinese
Breaking the Barriers: Chinese Literature Facing the World. Olof Palmes internationella centrum, 1997.
 Eileen Chang, Ett halvt liv av kärlek (Half a Lifelong Romance ), Atlantis 2019.
 Chen Ran, Privatliv (Private life ), Tranan 2012.
 Chi Zijian, På floden Arguns södra strand (The Last Quarter of the Moon ), Wanzhi 2018.
 Chun Sue, Beijing doll. Bra Böcker, 2005.
 Han Shaogong, Maqiao (Dictionary of Maqiao ) Albert Bonniers förlag, 2009.
 Hong Ying, K – en kärlekshistoria (K: The art of love ). Norstedts, 2001.
 Hong Ying. Flodens dotter (Daughter of the river ). Norstedts, 1999.
 Hong Ying. Svekets sommar (Summer of betrayal ). Norstedts, 1998.
 Jia Pingwa, Lyckan (Happy ), Wanzhi 2014.
 Jia Pingwa, Makalös (Broken Wings ), Wanzhi 2019.
 Jia Pingwa, Opera (Shaanxi Opera ), Wanzhi 2016.
 Liu Xiaobo, Jag har inga fiender, jag hyser inget hat (I have no enemies, I feel no hate ), Weyler förlag, 2011.
 Liu Zhenyun, Barn av sin tid, Wanzhi 2019.
 Liu Zhenyun, Ett ord i rättan tid (Someone to talk to ),Wanzhi, 2016.
 Liu Zhenyun, Processen (I didn't kill my husband ), Wanzhi, 2014.
 Liu Zhenyun, Tillbaka till 1942 (Back to 1942 ), Wanzhi 2017.
 Ma Jian, Rött damm (Red dust ) Fischer & Co, 2007.
 Ma Jian, Nudelbagaren (The noodle maker ) Fischer & Co, 2007.
 Mo Yan, Grodor (Frogs ), Tranan 2015.
 Mo Yan. Det röda fältet (Red sorghum ). Tranan, 1997.
 Mo Yan. Vitlöksballaderna (The garlic ballads ). Tranan, 2001.
 Mo Yan, Ximen Nao och hans sju liv (Life and death are wearing me out ), Tranan 2012.
 , Lägret. Wanzhi 2015.
Solskenet i munnen. 10 noveller (Sunshine in the mouth. 10 short stories ). Tranan, 2003.
 Su Tong. Den röda lyktan (Raise the Red Lantern , original title Wives and Concubines 妻妾成群). Tranan, 1993.
 Su Tong, Binu och den stora muren (Binu and the Great Wall ) Albert Bonniers förlag, 2008.
 Su Tong, Ris (Rice ), Wanzhi, 2016.
 Wei Hui. Shanghai Baby. Forum, 2002.
 Wei Jingsheng. Modet att stå ensam (The courage to stand alone). Bokförlaget DN, 1998.
 Xiao Bai, Avspärrningen (Sealed Off ), Nirstedt Litteratur 2019.
 Xiao Rundcrantz, Röd åklagare (Red prosecutor ). Bokförlaget DN, 2006.
 Hsing Yun, Mellan okunskap och upplysning (Between ignorance and enlightenment ). B4Press, 2005.
 Yan Lianke, Drömmar om byn Ding (Dream of Ding Village ), Atlantis 2013.
 Yan Lianke, Explosionskrönika (The Explosion Chronicles ), Atlantis 2019.
 Yan Lianke, Upptäck romanen, Wanzhi 2019.
 Yan Lianke, De fyra böckerna (The Four Books ), 2017.
 Yan Lianke, Lenins kyssar (Lenin's kisses), Atlantis 2015.
 Yang Lian & Ai Weiwei, Konst och människa (Art and Man ), Rámus 2019.
 Yang Lian, Koncentriska cirklar (Concentric Circles ), Wanzhi 2018.
 Yu Hua, Att leva (To Live ). Ruin, 2006.
 Yu Hua, Kina med tio ord (China in ten words ), Natur och kultur 2013.
 Yu Hua, Handelsman i blod (Blood merchant) Ruin, 2007.
 Yu Hua, Rop i duggregn (Cries in the drizzle ), Wanzhi 2017.
 Zhang Wei, Det gamla fartyget (The old ship ), Jinring 2013.
 Zhang Xinxin & Sang Ye. Leva i Kina (Living in China) (some chapters). Forum, 1988.
 Zhang Yueran, Båten (The Boat ), Tidskriften Karavan 2018.

Children's books
 Cao Wenxuan,  Fjäderns resa (The Feather), Hjulet 2014.
 Jimmy Liao, Stjärnenatt (Starry, starry night ), Mirando 2013.
 Jimmy Liao, Skogens hemligheter (Secrets of the forest ), Mirando 2014.
 Jimmy Liao, Färgernas ljud (The Sound of Colors , Mirando 2016.
 Jimmy Liao, När månen glömde (When the Moon Forgot ), Mirando 2019.
 Liu Hsu-Kung, Är du min bror (The Orange Coloured Horse ), Natur och kultur 2018.
 Yin Jianling, Sommarsång (Summer song ), JH Publishers 2011.

Translations from other languages
 Corinne Debaine-Francfort. Återupptäckten av det gamla Kina (La redécouverte de la Chine ancienne). Berghs, 1999.
 Ha Jin. Två kärlekar (Waiting). Forum, 2001.
 Johann S Lee, Tid för vila (Quiet time), Tranan 2015.
 Kopano Matlwa, Coconut, Tranan, 2010.
 O Thiam Chin, Aldrig bättre (Never been better), Tranan 2013.
 Qiu Xiaolong, De röda råttorna (A Case of Two Cities) Ordfront, 2008.
 Stephen Karcher. I Ching. Forum, 1998.
 FAN Xiulan. Hälsans tao. Det långa livets hemlighet (The Tao of Health). Svenska Förlaget, 2004.
 FAN Xiulan. Qigong enligt Biyun. Låt livskraften återvända (Qigong according to Biyun). Svenska Förlaget, 2000.

Children's books
 Nanoy Rafael & Sergio Bumatay III, Naku, nakuu, nakuuu! (Naku, nakuu, nakuuu!), Trasten 2012.
 Jili Jiang, Flickan med den röda halsduken (Red Scarf Girl) Berghs, 1999.
 Christian Epanya, Papa Diops taxi (Le taxi-brousse de Papa Diop), Trasten, 2006.
 To Hoai, En syrsas memoarer (Diary of a cricket/De men phieu luu ky) Trasten, 2006.
 Ingrid Mennen & Niki Daly, Ashraf från Afrika (Ashraf from Africa), Trasten, 2009.
 Mhlobo Jadezweni, Tshepo Mde är tillräckligt lång (Tshepo Mde is tall enough), Trasten, 2010.

Personal life
Chen married Chen Maiping, a writer, poet, translator and publisher. The couple has a son.

References

External links 

 
 
 
 "Bokberget" 
 Anna GUstafsson Chen's blog posts on Chinese Books for Young Readers

1965 births
Chinese–Swedish translators
Stockholm University alumni
Lund University alumni
Living people
Literary translators